Tammela is a municipality of Finland. It is located in the Tavastia Proper region. The first mention of a village named Tammela was in documents from 1423.

Neighbouring municipalities are Forssa, Hämeenlinna, Jokioinen, Karkkila, Lohja, Loppi, Somero and Urjala. The municipality is unilingually Finnish.

Two national parks, Torronsuo National Park and Liesjärvi National Park, are located in Tammela municipality.

Tammela is also the name of a district in the city of Tampere.

Villages
Hevoniemi, Hykkilä, Häiviä, Kallio, Kankainen, Kaukjärvi, Kaukola, Kuuslammi, Kytö, Letku, Liesjärvi, Lunkaa, Mustiala, Myllykylä, Ojainen, Pappila, Patamo, Pikonkorpi, Porras, Riihivalkama, Saari, Sukula, Susikas, Taljala, Talpia, Tammela, Teuro, Torajärvi, Torro.

People born in Tammela
Robert Wilhelm Lagerborg (1796 –1849)
Toivo Alavirta  (1890 – 1940)
Rabbe Enckell  (1903 – 1974)
Eino Kujanpää  (1904 – 1980)
Antti Laaksonen (1972 –)
Santeri Laine (1994 – 2017)
Elias Seppänen (2003 –)

References

External links

Municipality of Tammela – Official website 
Outinthenature.com – Kyynäränharju is a scenic ridge in Liesjärvi National Park
Outinthenature.com – Torronsuo National Park, Finland’s deepest bog

 
Populated places established in 1868
1868 establishments in Finland